X Factor is an Italian television music competition to find new singing talent; the winner receives a € 300,000 recording contract with Sony Music. Before the start of the auditions process it was confirmed that Simona Ventura, Morgan, Elio and Arisa would be confirmed as judges and mentors; also Alessandro Cattelan returned as host, whilst Max Novaresi and Brenda Lodigiani return to host Xtra Factor. The sixths season began airing on Sky Uno on 20 September and ended on 7 December 2012.

Auditions for season 6 took place in Rimini, Andria and Milan in June 2012; bootcamp took place in Milan for two days, on 28 and 29 June. Morgan mentored the Over-25s, Ventura the boys, Elio the girls and Arisa the groups; they selected their final three acts during judges' houses. The Live Shows started on 18 October at Teatro della Luna, Assago. On Live Show 3 (November 1), the 12 finalists were joined by a 13th wildcard, voted for by the public after each judge picked one of their rejected to return.

Chiara Galiazzo, a member of the category Over-25s and mentored by Morgan, was announced the winner of the competition on 7 December 2012. Her winner's single, "Due respiri", released immediately after the end of the show, was co-written by Italian singer-songwriter Eros Ramazzotti.

Judges, presenters and other personnel

Sky Italia entirely confirmed the cast of X Factor 5 for the sixths season. On 12 April 2012, Alessandro Cattelan was confirmed to present the main show on Sky Uno HD. Rumors about a possible replacement as a judge of Arisa with singer Gianna Nannini were soon denied, and indeed it was confirmed on 25 May that all the judges of the fifth series (Arisa, Simona Ventura, Elio, Morgan) would return to their role.

Also vocal coaches Alberto Tafuri, Paola Folli and Giuseppe Barbera, music-director Lucio Fabbri and art-director and choreographer Luca Tomassini were confirmed, whilst vocal-coach Gaetano Cappa replaced Diego Calvetti in the role.

Selection process

Applications and auditions

A preliminary phase of auditions was held:
at Fiera del Levante, Bari, on 5 and 6 May 2012;
at MiCo, Milan, from 19 to 21 May;
at Foro Italico, Rome, from 26 to 28 May.

The judges auditions were held:
at 105 Stadium, Rimini, on 9 and 10 June 2012;
at Palazzetto dello Sport, Andria, on 16 and 17 June;
at Teatro Nazionale, Milan, on 23 and 24 June.

The first episode of audition was broadcast on 20 September 2009, and featured auditions from Rimini and Milan; Andria auditions, along with those from Rome, were shown on 27 September.

Notable auditioners included Miss Italia 2011 Stefania Bivone, Michele Grandinetti, a singer already famous in Thailand with his stage name Miki del Re, and performer and actress Carmen Serra.

Bootcamp
96 acts reached Bootcamp, which took place at the Teatro Nazionale in Milan over two days, on Thursday 28 and Friday 29 June, and was broadcast on 4 October.
On the first day, judges reviewed the audition tapes and sent home 1/3 of the acts before they had another chance to sing, soon after their arrival in Milan;
the remaining 65 acts were then put into groups and took part in a sing-off: each group was assigned a song to prepare for the next morning. Members of the groups could choose which part of the song to sing, in agreement with the other components. After each performance, the judges decided which acts to keep and which to eliminate. The number of acts was reduced to 41;
the acts had only 4 hours to choose one song from a list of 100 and perform it in front of the judges. Later, the judges decided which 24 acts to put through to judges' houses.

At the end of Bootcamp, judges met the acts of the category they had to mentor: Girls were to be mentored by Elio, Boys by Simona Ventura, Groups by Arisa and Over-25 by Morgan.

Judges' houses
"Home visits" was broadcast on 11 October. Ventura mentored the Boys in Costa Smeralda, assisted by vocal coach Paola Folli; Elio took the Girls at Villa Gaia, Robecco sul Naviglio, assisted by Alberto Tafuri; Morgan had the over 25s in Teatro Regio, Parma, with Gaetano Cappa, and Arisa had the Groups in Lake Como with Giuseppe Barbera.

One of the acts from the 25+ category, Mara Sottocornola, frightened by the mechanisms of the competition, decided to not take part in this phase, preferring to accept a proposal for an opera-stage in Brussels, and wasn't replaced.

The eleven eliminated acts were:
Boys: Alessandro Mahmoud, Francesco Vecchio, Carmelo Veneziano Broccia
Girls: Gaya Misrachi, Marta Pedoni, Lucrezia Rossetti
25+: Didie Caria, Michele Grandinetti
Groups: Brutte Abitudini, Diamond Sisters, Up3Side

Contestants and categories

Key:
 – Winner
 – Runner-up
 – Third place

Boys
Nicola Aliotta (born 26 April 1992) is a student from Rome. Before X Factor 6, he previously appeared in the television music competition Ti lascio una canzone. He sang "Come il sole all'improvviso" at the judges auditions in Andria obtaining 4 "yes's", "Without You" (for the group performance) at the Bootcamp and "Nessun dolore" at the Home Visits, where he and Alessandro Mahmoud had to perform again before Simona Ventura could make a final decision. He sang "Solo per te".
Daniele Coletta (born 10 February 1992) was born in Rome, and he's unemployed. Before X Factor 6, he previously appeared in the television music competition Ti lascio una canzone (2008). He sang "21 Guns" at the judges auditions in Rome obtaining 4 "yes's", "Don't Stop Me Now" (for the group performance) and "I Don't Want to Miss a Thing" at the Bootcamp and "I Can't Stand the Rain" at the Home Visits.
Davide Merlini (born 28 April 1992) was born in Marostica, Veneto, and he works as boiler maintener technician. He sang "Avrai" at the judges auditions in Rimini obtaining 4 "yes's", "Vent'anni" at the Bootcamp and "Tracce di te" at the Home Visits.
Alessandro Mahmoud (born 12 September 1992) was born in Milan. He's of Egyptian descent. He sang "Black and Gold" at the judges auditions in Milan obtaining 4 "yes's", "Turning Tables" (for the group performance) at the Bootcamp and "Walk On By" at the Home Visits, where he and Nicola Aliotta had to perform again before Simona Ventura could make a final decision. Mahmoud sang "Marzo (Le cose non vanno mai come credi)" and lost to Nicola Aliotta; in the second live show, on October 25, he won the wildcard and entered as a finalist since November 1.

Girls
Cixi (born 11 April 1996) is a fashion-design student from Chieri, Piedmont; her real name's Eleonora Bosio. She performed "History Repeating" at the judges auditions in Rimini obtaining 3 "yes's" from Elio, Morgan and Arisa and one "no" from Ventura. She sang "Turning Tables" for the group performance at the Bootcamp and "Tutto quello che un uomo" at the Home Visits.
Yendry Fiorentino (born 27 July 1993) is a fashion model. Born in Santo Domingo, she lives in Turin. She performed "Video Games" at the judges auditions in Milan obtaining 4 "yes's". She sang "Price Tag" (group performance) and "Una poesia anche per te" at the Bootcamp and "Le tasche piene di sassi" at the Home Visits, where she and Gaya Misrachi had to perform again before Elio could make a final decision. She sang "I'd Rather Go Blind".
Nice (born 12 November 1992) is a Foreign Languages student from Turin; her real name is Noemi Lucco Borlera. She sang "Dog Days Are Over" at the judges auditions in Rimini obtaining 4 "yes's", "Hey, Soul Sister" (for the group performance) and "Piece of My Heart" at the Bootcamp and "Abitudine" at the Home Visits.

25+
Romina Falconi (born 1 January 1985) is a singer from Rome. In 2007 she competed in Sanremo Music Festival and in 2009 she worked as choirgirl during Eros Ramazzotti's World Tour. She sang "Fortissimo" at the judges auditions in Rimini obtaining 4 "yes's", "Cuore scoppiato" (for the group performance) at the Bootcamp and "Crazy" at the Home Visits.
Chiara Galiazzo (born 12 August 1986) is a finance trainée from Padua. She sang "Teardrop" at the auditions in front of the judges, in Milan, who acclaimed her for the performance. She sang "Back to Black" (for the group performance) and "The World Is Not Enough" at the Bootcamp and "Shake It Out" at the Home Visits.
Ics (born 19 May 1983) is a rapper from Bologna who previously published some of his works through independent circuits with the stage nome of Morgan Ics. He sang "La crisi" at the judges auditions in Rimini obtaining 3 "yes's" from Elio, Morgan and Arisa and one "no" from Ventura. He later performed "Price Tag" (for the group performance) and "Notorious" at the Bootcamp and "Nessun dorma" at the Home Visits.

Groups
Akmé is a group formed by Rosa D'Aprile (born 26 October 1982), Vitantonio Boccuzzi (born 8 December 1990) and Vito Marchitelli (born 7 August 1991) in the Province of Bari. They sang "21 Guns" at the judges auditions in Milan obtaining 4 "yes's", and "Otherside" at the Home Visits.
Donatella is a group formed by twin-sisters Giulia and Silvia Provvedi (born 1 December 1993), from Modena. They performed "Il mare d'inverno" at the judges auditions in Bari, with the stage name "Provs Destination", obtaining 4 "yes's"; later they sang "Folle città" (for the group performance) at the Bootcamp and "Snow on the Sahara" at the Home Visits.
Frères Chaos is a group formed by siblings Fabio (born 1 March 1988) and Manuela Rinaldi (born 10 March 1993), from Magliano di Tenna, Marche. Manuela Rinaldi previously appeared on talent show Ti lascio una canzone (2008). They performed "Altrove" at the judges auditions in Rimini, obtaining 4 "yes's"; later they sang "Sally" (for the group performance) and "Love the Way You Lie" at the Bootcamp and "Seven Nation Army" at the Home Visits.

Live shows

Results summary
The number of votes received by each act were released by Sky Italia after the final.

Colour key

Live show details

Week 1 (18 October 2012)
Celebrity performers: Francesca Michielin ("Distratto" and "Sola") and Robbie Williams ("Rock DJ"/"Let Me Entertain You" and "Candy")

Judges' votes to eliminate
 Simona Ventura: Yendry Fiorentino – backed her own act, Nicola Aliotta.
 Elio: Nicola Aliotta – backed his own act, Yendry Fiorentino.
 Arisa: Nicola Aliotta – found him too much scholastic in his way of singing.
 Morgan: Nicola Aliotta – felt he was not ready to be a popstar.

Week 2 (25 October 2012)
Celebrity performers: Club Dogo ("Tutto ciò che ho" featuring Il Cile and "P.E.S." featuring Giuliano Palma)

Judges' votes to eliminate
 Arisa: Akmé – felt they were not ready to be popstars.
 Morgan: Akmé – was in line with the decision of their mentor.
 Ventura: Akmé – considered Frères Chaos particularly interesting.
 Elio was not required to vote because there was already a majority, but confirmed he would have eliminated Akmé.

Wildcard

Week 3 (1 November)
Theme: Let's Band!
Celebrity performers: Scissor Sisters ("Only the Horses") and One Direction ("Live While We're Young")

Judges' decisions to eliminate
 Ventura: Romina Falconi – backed her own act, Alessandro Mamhoud.
 Morgan: Alessandro Mahmoud – backed his own act, Romina Falconi.
 Elio: Alessandro Mahmoud – thought that Falconi could have more chances in the music business.
 Arisa: Alessandro Mahmoud – found Falconi more convincent in the final showdown.

Week 4 (8 November)
Theme: Hell Factor (double elimination)
Celebrity performers: Arisa ("Meraviglioso amore mio") and Emis Killa ("Parole di ghiaccio")

Judges' decisions to eliminate (Part 1)
 Arisa: Yendry Fiorentino – backed her own act, Donatella.
 Elio: Donatella – backed his own act, Yendry Fiorentino.
 Morgan: Donatella – recognized Yendry's superiority voice.
 Ventura: Yendry Fiorentino – could not decide so chose to take it to deadlock.
With both acts receiving two votes each, the result went to deadlock and reverted to the earlier public vote. Donatella were eliminated as the act with the fewest public votes.

Judges' decisions to eliminate (Part 2)
 Ventura: Romina Falconi – backed her own act, Daniele Coletta.
 Morgan: Daniele Coletta – backed his own act, Romina Falconi.
 Arisa: Daniele Coletta – found Romina's voice more emotional.
 Elio: Romina Falconi – recognized Coletta's superiority in the performances.
With both acts receiving two votes each, the result went to deadlock and reverted to the earlier public vote. Falconi were eliminated as the act with the fewest public votes.

Week 5 (15 November)
Theme: Hell Factor (double elimination)
Celebrity performer: Malika Ayane ("Tre cose") and Alanis Morissette ("Guardian")

Judges' votes to eliminate
 Ventura: Nice – backed her own act, Daniele Coletta.
 Elio: Daniele Coletta – backed his own act, Nice.
 Arisa: Daniele Coletta – found Nice's voice extraordinary.
 Morgan: Nice – was not satisfied with Nice's performance of the night.
With both acts receiving two votes each, the result went to deadlock and reverted to the earlier public vote. Nice were eliminated as the act with the fewest public votes.

Week 6: Quarter-final (22 November)
Group performance: "I Will Survive"
Celebrity performer: Conor Maynard ("Turn Around")
Theme: Dance performance (Round 1); Mentor's Choice (Round 2)

Judges' decisions to eliminate
 Ventura: Frères Chaos – backed her own act, Davide Merlini.
 Arisa: Davide Merlini – backed her own act, Fréres Chaos.
 Morgan: Davide Merlini – found Fréres Chaos strongly communicative.
 Elio: Frères Chaos – did not appreciate their style.
With both acts receiving two votes each, the result went to deadlock and reverted to the earlier public vote. Frères Chaos were eliminated as the act with the fewest public votes.

Week 7: Semi-final (29 November)
Group performance: "Your Song" (with Mika)
Celebrity performer: Mika ("Grace Kelly" and "Underwater")
Theme: Previously unreleased songs (Round 1); Mentor's Choice (Round 2)

Judges' votes to eliminate
 Ventura: Cixi – backed her own act, Daniele Coletta.
 Elio: Daniele Coletta – backed his own act, Cixi.
 Arisa: Daniele Coletta – loved Cixi's voice.
 Morgan: Cixi – preferred Coletta.
With both acts receiving two votes each, the result went to deadlock and reverted to the earlier public vote. Danielle Coletta was eliminated as the act with the fewest public votes.

Week 8: Final (6/7 December)
6 December
Group performance: "Who Knew"/"Stand by Me"/"The Edge of Glory"/"I Will Always Love You" (all X Factor acts)
Theme: "My song" (own choice); tribute to Lucio Dalla; previously unreleased songs
Celebrity performer: Kylie Minogue ("Can't Get You Out of My Head"), DJ Fish

7 December
Group performance: "Terra promessa"/"We Will Rock You"
Theme: Celebrity duets (part 1), previously unreleased songs, "Best of" (3-songs medley) and "a cappella" performance (part 2)
Celebrity performer: Eros Ramazzotti ("Un angelo disteso al sole") and Skye Edwards ("Featherlight")

Best performance award

During the final live show, Cixi was awarded for the most innovative and spectacular performance ("You've Got the Love", Live Show 1); the contenders were the top six acts, and the performances were arbitrarily chosen by the production members and the main sponsor Enel. They were voted through a free-poll, on the official website; On December 6, the less two voted contendants (Fréres Chaos and Davide Merlini) were excluded from the competition.

References

External links
 X Factor Italia

2012 Italian television seasons
Italian music television series
Italy 06
X Factor (Italian TV series)